Wojciech Fibak and Joakim Nyström were the champions of the event when it last took place, in 1986. Neither of them participated in 1990.Patrick Galbraith and David Macpherson won the title, defeating Neil Broad and Kevin Curren 2–6, 6–4, 6–3, in the final.

Seeds
The top four seeds receive a bye into the second round. 

  Rick Leach /  Jim Pugh (quarterfinals)
  Jim Grabb /  Patrick McEnroe (withdrew)
  Ken Flach /  Robert Seguso (second round)
  Scott Davis /  David Pate (quarterfinals)
  Darren Cahill /  Mark Kratzmann (first round)
  Neil Broad /  Kevin Curren (final)
  Grant Connell /  Glenn Michibata (second round)
  Jim Courier /  Pete Sampras (withdrew)

Draw

Finals

Top half

Bottom half

References
General

1990 ATP Tour
1990 Doubles